The Grammy Award for Best Alternative Music Performance is an award presented by the Recording Academy to honor quality alternative music performances in any given year. The award was presented for the first time on 5 February 2023 at the 65th Annual Grammy Awards, is a companion category to the Grammy Award for Best Alternative Music Album and the first new category in the alternative genre field since the field's creation in 1991.

The Academy announced the new category in June 2022, stating that the award goes to "a track or single performance that recognizes the best recordings in an alternative performance by a solo artist, collaborating artists, established duo, or established group."

Background  
In 1991, and from 1994 to 1999, the award for Best Alternative Music Album was known as Best Alternative Music Performance. In this time, it was won by Sinéad O'Connor, U2, Green Day, Nirvana, Beck, Radiohead and Beastie Boys.

Winners & Nominees

References 

Grammy Award categories